The City of Busselton is a local government area in the South West region of Western Australia, approximately  south of Perth, the state capital. It contains two large towns, Busselton and Dunsborough, and a number of smaller towns. The city office is located on Southern Drive, Busselton.

History

The City of Busselton was established as the Busselton Road District on 11 May 1951 with the amalgamation of the Municipality of Busselton, governing the area of Busselton bounded by West Street and Ford Road, and the Sussex Road District, governing the remaining area. Both bodies had been established in 1871.

The road district was declared a shire and became the Shire of Busselton with effect from 1 July 1961 following the passage of the Local Government Act 1960, which reformed all remaining road districts into shires.

In 2007 it abolished its system of wards for electing councillors. On 21 January 2012 the Shire of Busselton gained city status and became the City of Busselton.

The City of Busselton and neighbouring Capel are among the state's fastest growing areas.

Towns, suburbs and localities
The towns, suburbs and localities of the City of Busselton with population and size figures based on the most recent Australian census:

(* indicates locality is only partially located within this city)

Population
The historical populations of the Busselton Municipal District and the Sussex Road District were as follows before their amalgamation:
 

The figures for the censuses since the council amalgamation are as follows:

Heritage-listed places

As of 2023, 225 places are heritage-listed in the City of Busselton, of which 33 are on the State Register of Heritage Places, among them the Cape Naturaliste Lighthouse, Busselton Jetty  and Wonnerup House.

See also
 List of heritage places in Busselton

References

External links
 

Busselton
Busselton